Willows Korean Aviation School was an aviation school meant to train fighter pilots for the Korean Independence Movement, many of whom were members of the Korean National Association. It was established in 1920 in Glenn County, California, by Korean-Americans and backed by the Korean Provisional Government in Shanghai.

The choice for a Korean Aviation School to be established in California was for multiple reasons including the March 1st movement, interest and financial support from the Korean American community, the impact of World War I on aviation for combat and defensive purposes, and Japan's inability to control or influence the school on US soil. The financial support largely came from the first Korean-American millionaire Kim Chong Lim, until his fortune was lost when a disastrous flood in October 1920 destroyed his rice fields.

Although the school lasted for a little over a year, it had gained a lot of attention and trained many of the pioneers of Korean aviation, including Park Hee-sung, Lee Yong-keun, and Song Yi-kyun. Two of its graduates went on to join the Republic of Korea Air Force, which recognizes the Willows Korean Aviation School as its predecessor.

See also
History of Korea
Provisional Government of Republic of Korea
Korean independence movement
Korean National Association
Sinhan Minbo

References

Bibliography 

Miller, B. (2015, July 9). Willows Korean Aviation School Fueled Independence Movement. Retrieved from https://ucrtoday.ucr.edu/30192
 Koreans To Have Aviation Field (1920, June 14) Willows Daily Journal. Retrieved from http://digitallibrary.usc.edu/cdm/ref/collection/p15799coll126/id/5716 
Koreans To Train Aviators here to Fight the Japs (1920, March 1). Willows Daily Journal. Retrieved from http://digitallibrary.usc.edu/cdm/ref/collection/p15799coll126/id/5716
Koreans Aviation School to Be Seen in Movies (n.d.). Willows Daily Journal. Retrieved from http://digitallibrary.usc.edu/cdm/ref/collection/p15799coll126/id/5716

Republic of Korea Air Force
Aviation schools in the United States
1921 disestablishments in California
1920 establishments in California
Educational institutions established in 1920
Korean-American culture in California
Educational institutions disestablished in 1921